The 2009 European Karate Championships, the 44th edition, were held at the Dom Sportova in Zagreb, Croatia from 8 to 10 May 2009. A total of 479 competitors participated at the event.

Participating countries

Medallists

Men's competition

Individual

Team

Women's competition

Individual

Team

Medal table

References

External links
 Karate Records – European Championship 2009

2009
International sports competitions hosted by Croatia
European Karate Championships
European championships in 2009
Sports competitions in Zagreb
2000s in Zagreb
Karate competitions in Croatia
May 2009 sports events in Europe